About a Girl is a 2014 German comedy film directed by Mark Monheim.

Cast 
 Jasna Fritzi Bauer - Charleen
 Heike Makatsch - Sabine
  - Jeff
 Simon Schwarz - Volker
 Lauritz Greve - Oscar
  - Oma Emmi
  - Isa
  - Linus
  - Dr. Frei
 Heike Koslowski - Frau Richter
  - Tim
 Joana Verbeek von Loewis - Paula
 Horst Sachtleben - Pfarrer
 Michael Gempart - Bestatter Kurt

References

External links 

2014 films
2014 comedy films
German comedy films
2010s German-language films
2010s German films